Aston Francis (born March 20, 1997) is an American professional basketball player who last played for the Lakeland Magic of the NBA G League. He played college basketball for three seasons at Wheaton College, where he won the Bevo Francis Award after averaging an NCAA-leading 34.3 points per game in his senior season. Francis previously played for Tyler Junior College.

Early life and high school career
Francis began playing basketball at age four or five, as well as soccer and baseball. His father taught him about basketball. Francis played the sport for All Saints Episcopal School in Tyler, Texas, where his father was the athletic director and coach. As a senior, he averaged 21.7 points per game, leading his team to the Texas Association of Private and Parochial Schools 4A title game. Francis was named Tyler Morning Telegraph Player of the Year and ETFinalScore.com All-East Texas Most Valuable Player.

College career
In his freshman season, Francis played for Tyler Junior College, averaging 4.5 points per game in limited playing time, before transferring to NCAA Division III program Wheaton College. On January 12, 2017, he scored a sophomore season-high 39 points in a loss to Illinois Wesleyan, the ninth-most single-game points in program history. As a sophomore, Francis led the College Conference of Illinois and Wisconsin with 23.4 points per game and made a school-record 94 three-pointers. He was named to the first team All-CCIW. On December 9, 2017, Francis scored a junior season-high 45 points in a double overtime win over Elmhurst, the fifth-highest single-game total in Wheaton history. He finished the season averaging a program-record 27.4 points, 4.8 rebounds and 4.4 assists per game, while breaking his own single-season program record with 121 three-pointers. Francis was named CCIW Most Outstanding Player and was named a second-team Division III All-American by the National Association of Basketball Coaches (NABC) and D3hoops.com.

As a senior, he led Wheaton to its first Final Four at the NCAA Division III Tournament. In the clinching game on March 9, 2019, Francis scored an NCAA tournament-record 62 points, including 12 three-pointers, to go with 12 rebounds in a win over Marietta. He finished the tournament averaging 44.8 points per game, setting a new record. In his senior season, he averaged 34.3 points per game, which led all NCAA divisions, and scored a Division III-record 1,096 points while sporting a crew cut. Additionally, Francis was the Division III leader in three-pointers, field goals and free throws. He averaged a team-high 7.9 rebounds and ranked second on his team with 3.1 assists per game. Francis was honored with the Bevo Francis Award and was named D3hoops.com Player of the Year. He was a first-team All-American by D3hoops.com and a second-team Division III All-American by NABC. Francis won CCIW Most Outstanding Player for his second straight season. He left Wheaton with the second-most points in program history and as its all-time leader in three-pointers.

Professional career
Francis joined Mega Tbilisi in Georgia on December 23, 2020. He scored 23 points in a 96–86 defeat of Kavkasia, as Mega secured a sweep for the Georgian A-Liga Championship in his first season. Francis was named to the League 1st Team, and won honors for Player of the Year and Finals MVP.

On December 25th, 2021, Francis joined the Wisconsin Herd, the NBA G League affiliate for 2021 NBA reigning champions Milwaukee Bucks. Francis was then later waived on January 19, 2022.

On January 25, Francis was acquired by the Lakeland Magic, making his debut that evening for the team. He was then later waived on January 29, 2022.

References

External links
Wheaton Thunder bio
Eurobasket.net profile

1997 births
Living people
American men's basketball players
American expatriate basketball people in Georgia (country)
Basketball players from Texas
Lakeland Magic players
Point guards
Shooting guards
Sportspeople from Tyler, Texas
Tyler Apaches men's basketball players
Wheaton Thunder men's basketball players
Wisconsin Herd players